Amanda Murphy (born 20 September 1985) is a former New Zealand rugby union player.

In 2009, Murphy had made an appearance for the Black Ferns against an England A team at Esher. Murphy made her international debut for New Zealand on 26 November 2011 against England at London.

Murphy has a Bachelor of Applied Science and a Bachelor of Sport and Exercise Science degree.

Murphy was named as Assistant Strength and Conditioning Coach for the Black Ferns in 2022. She was the Women's Rugby High Performance Manager for Canterbury Rugby.

References

External links 

 Black Ferns Profile

1985 births
Living people
New Zealand female rugby union players
New Zealand women's international rugby union players